Fakhr, also Fakhar or Faḵr, may be a given name or a surname. It literally means  "pride", "honor", "glory" in Arabic. It may also be a part of a given name such as Fakhr al-Din, "pride of the faith".  Notable people with the name include:

Given name
Fakhr al-Din, multiple people
 Fakhr al-Mulk Ridwan, ruler of Aleppo
 Fakhr-un-Nisa, Islamic scholar and calligrapher
 Fakhr-un-Nissa, first child of Mughal Emperor Babur
Fakhr Fakhr, Lebanese Maronite army officer and politician
Fakhr Azam Wazir, Pakistani politician
Fakhar Hussain
Fakhar Zaman, multiple people

Surname
Darvish Fakhr, Iranian American artist
Fakhr Fakhr, Lebanese Maronite army officer and politician
Marouane Fakhr, Moroccan footballer
Sana Fakhar

See also

Saqr Abu Fakhr,  Arab writer living in Lebanon

Arabic-language surnames